The 1998 Wandhama massacre refers to the killings of 23 Kashmiri Hindus in the town of Wandhama in the Ganderbal District of Jammu and Kashmir, India on 25 January, 1998. The massacre was blamed on the militant outfits Lashkar-e-Taiba and Hizbul Mujahideen. The victims included four children and nine women.

The massacre
According to the testimony of one of the survivors of the incident, a 14-year-old Hindu boy named Vinod Kuman Dhar, the gunmen came to their house dressed like Indian Army soldiers, had tea with them, waiting for a radio message indicating that all Hindu families in the village had been covered. After a brief conversation they rounded up all the members of the Hindu households and then summarily gunned them down with Kalashnikov rifles.

Perpetrators 
The Indian government has blamed the militant outfit Lashkar-e-Taiba for carrying out the massacre.

Other accounts blamed Abdul Hamid Gada of Hizbul Mujahideen. In these accounts, the massacre was timed to coincide with Shab-e-Qadar, the holiest night of the month of Ramadan, when believers stay awake until dawn. Gada was subsequently killed by Indian security forces in 2000.

Aftermath
The day after the incident, agitating Kashmiri Hindus clashed with police in New Delhi, broke barricades and tried to force their way to the National Human Rights Commission. At least 11 protesters were injured in the clashes.

Indian Prime Minister Inder Kumar Gujral joined the mourners in Wandhama on 28 January, accompanied by Governor K. V. Krishna Rao, Chief Minister Farooq Abdullah, and Union Minister for Environment Saifuddin Soz. Gujral said:

There were also protests in several refugee camps where Kashmiri Hindus had been living since their exodus in 1990.

See also
 2003 Nadimarg massacre
 1998 Prankote massacre
 Chittisinghpura massacre, another massacre in Kashmir where perpetrators wore Indian Army uniforms
 List of massacres in India

Notes

References

1998 murders in India
Massacres in 1998
Mass murder in 1998
Crime in India
Crime in Jammu and Kashmir
Human rights abuses in Jammu and Kashmir
Kashmir conflict
Religiously motivated violence in India
Violence against Hindus in India
Persecution of Hindus
Massacres in Jammu and Kashmir
Massacres of Hindus in Kashmir